The men's Mass Start at the 2020 KNSB Dutch Single Distance Championships in Heerenveen took place at Thialf ice skating rink on Sunday 29 December 2019.

Result 

Source:

Referee: Rieks van Lubek. Starter: Sieme Kok 
Start: 17:43 hr. Finish: 18:20 hr.

References

Single Distance Championships
2020 Single Distance